St Albans School is a public school (English private school) in the city of St Albans in Hertfordshire. Pre-sixth form admission is restricted to boys, but the sixth form has been co-educational since 1991. Founded in 948 by Wulsin, St Albans School is the oldest school in Hertfordshire and one of the oldest schools in the world, being located on a 500 acre site. The school is known for its academic prowess, achieving excellent results and gaining several places at the top universities, specifically Oxbridge. The school now has state-of-the-art science facilities unlike any other school in the country, also having educated a multitude of scientists, a few examples being Stephen Hawking, who dedicated some of his success to the school (Formally, the only place that taught him maths) and Ian Grant. The school created The Stephen Hawking Society as part of a tribute to the former pupil. As part of this, many famous scientists such as the 2001 Nobel Prize winner, Dr Tim Hunt, have given lectures at the school.

The headmaster is Jonathan Gillespie, appointed in 2014, he has taught at various schools such as Highgate and Fettes college and was educated at Selwyn college, Cambridge. His first experience of headship was at Lancing College.

School arms

 The school coat of arms is composed of the cross of Saint Alban together with the School motto.

The cross of Saint Alban is a gold saltire (a cross, signifying that Alban was martyred, but diagonal, as he was beheaded, not crucified) on a blue field (or, in heraldic terms, Azure, a saltire Or).

The current school motto is Non nobis nati ("Born not for ourselves"). This dates back to the family of the 12th century Geoffrey de Gorham (Master and subsequently Abbot of St Albans), deriving from Cicero's ("Non nobis solum nati sumus"; "We are not born for ourselves alone"), and was used until the Reformation.  It was re-introduced in 1994, thereby stressing the link between the School before and after the dissolution of the monastery in 1539.

Non nobis nati replaced the previous motto Mediocria firma ("The middle road is best"), used between the 16th and 20th centuries.  This was the motto of the Bacon family at Gorhambury (including Sir Nicholas and Sir Francis Bacon). This formed part of the Bacon coat of arms, which for instance can still be seen outside the Verulam Arms public house in nearby Welclose Street and inside St Mary's Church, Redbourn.

History

Pre-Reformation history

The school was founded within St Albans Abbey by Abbot Wulsin in 948 and was the first school in the world to accept students not intending to join a religious order, being the first school open to the wider public. By the 12th century, the School had built for itself such a reputation that the famous Norman scholars Geoffrey de Gorham and Alexander Neckam applied for the post of Master. Geoffrey de Gorham was later to become Abbot of St Albans in 1119, and the School then remained under the control of the Abbot until the dissolution of the Abbey in 1539.

By the 12th century, the school was one of the largest in the British Isles.  On 16 September 1309, the school was given new statutes, including scholarships for poor students. The school and Abbey were sacked in 1381 during the Peasants' Revolt. (The revolt's leader John Ball, was also a former pupil of the school.) By the 15th century, the school was located in buildings in Romeland and inside the Abbey Gateway, which from 1479 housed schoolmaster's press. The St Albans Press continues today, in a semi-dormant form, as "John Insomuch Schoolmaster Printer 1479 Ltd", making the school the oldest extant presses in the world.

Post-Reformation history
After the dissolution of the Abbey in 1539, Richard Boreman, the last Abbot, became Headmaster and the school moved to a chapel near St Peter's church in St Albans after its buildings in Romeland were demolished by Sir Richard Lee for building materials to rebuild Sopwell Priory into a country house. In 1549, to put the school on a firmer foundation, the last Abbot was granted the right to maintain a Grammar School by a private Act of Parliament. Around 1545, the school outgrew its St Peter's church premises and moved again to the Lady Chapel at the east end of the Abbey, bought for the huge sum of £100, and it was separated from the rest of the abbey with a wall made of smashed stones from the ancient shrine of St Alban. In 1553 the Crown sold the rest of the Abbey Church to the town for £400 (the value of the lead on its roof) and became a Church of England parish church for the new Borough of St Albans.

In 1570 Sir Nicholas Bacon, Lord Keeper of the Great Seal and father of Sir Francis Bacon, then living at nearby Gorhambury, gave the school new statutes and re-endowed the School by successful petitioning Queen Elizabeth I for a Wine Charter (extended by King James I in 1606). The only other educational institutions with the same privileges to tax the alcohol trade in their localities were the University of Oxford and the University of Cambridge. The income from taxation on wine and beer sales in the St Albans continued to fund the school until 1922, when they were surrendered to the Treasury in return for £1200 in the Oxford and St Albans Wine Privileges (Abolition) Bill. Other benefactors from this period include Sir Richard Platt, Citizen of London, sometime Master of the Worshipful Company of Brewers and later founder of Aldenham School, who 'conveyed to the Mayor and Burgesses, and their Successors for ever' former-Abbey land on George Street in St Albans for the benefit of the school, and Charles Hale, whose relative Richard Hale later founded a grammar school in the town of Hertford.

Queen Elizabeth I and Sir Nicholas Bacon also founded the school's library in 1570, which moved from Sumpter Yard in the 19th century to the Abbey Gateway, and then in the 1980s to an impressive converted 19th century neo-Gothic hall, opened by Colin Renfrew, then Master of Jesus College, Cambridge.  The library collection now holds over 16,000 volumes and Elizabeth I is still regarded as the 'Benefactor Royal' of the St Albans School Library.

Other significant benefactions to the school include a gift of clay pits near St Albans made in 1582 and a significant amount of land by Charles Woollam, an Old Albanian, in the 19th century, including playing fields at Belmont Hill and St Alban's "Holy Well", which was a site for medieval pilgrimage.

In 1626, King Charles I visited the school in a royal inspection.  His visit to St Albans was recorded by a royal crest being built into one of the fireplace surrounds in the Abbey Gateway and this room is still called the "King Charles Room" in honour of his visit.

After over three centuries in the Lady Chapel, in 1871, due to the restoration of the Abbey and the re-instatement of the Lady Chapel, the school moved into the Abbey Gateway (which had been built in 1365 and, following the dissolution, had been used as a prison for 300 years; now a scheduled ancient monument).

Between 1907 and 1976, it was a direct grant grammar school, keeping the name St Albans School for most part not least because of the existence of 2 separate Boys' and Girls' Grammar Schools in St Albans and was generally referred to simply as a Direct Grant School. In the 1960s and 1970s many of the pupils at the school enjoyed a free education, paid for by public funds.  From 1980 to 2005, it also offered free places to poor but academically talented pupils under the Assisted Places Scheme.  Since the 1970s, the school has also offered a large number of scholarships and bursaries up to 100% of the school's fees, funded from its endowments.

Since the 19th century, there have been many additions to the school site, which now comprises a very interesting architectural mixture of buildings dating from the Roman-era cellar, where the archives are kept under the Abbey Gateway, to modern extensions built in the 1990s. The school also includes the oldest room in the world regularly used as a classroom, the 12th century West Gate Room, which was incorporated from a previous gateway into the current Abbey Gateway in the 1360s. Ptolemy Dean is the current school architect.

The Woollam Playing Fields, a couple of miles away to the north of the city, provides an extensive, modern, outdoor sports facility for the School and the Old Albanian Sports Club. At over 100 acres, it was the largest sporting development in Western Europe until the construction of the Olympic Park in East London for the 2012 games. The site was officially opened in October 2002 by Prince Richard, The Duke of Gloucester. Woollam's was built on part of a 400-acre farm owned by the school, which also contains a field studies centre used by the school's biology department. In 2003, the school opened a new Drama Department building and theatre in Romeland, on the site of the medieval school's building, called the "New Place".

The summer of 2012 saw the completion of a new sports centre on site, with sports hall, swimming pool, climbing wall, fitness suite and dance studio. Another recent development was the acquisition of Aquis Court, an office building adjacent to the school, which provides facilities for the sixth form, with a new common room, cafeteria and classrooms, while the art department also has new facilities.

Religion and musical education
The school still maintains links with St Albans Cathedral, which doubles as the school's chapel. Services are held there every Monday and Friday morning during term time, and special events held there include the annual Founders' Day and two carol services, led by the school choir, who still wear black and blue gowns in the same style as worn by undergraduates at Trinity College, Cambridge and similar to those worn by monks at the Abbey in medieval times. In addition, the school's music staff are usually linked with the Abbey's musical staff. Andrew Parnell, organist and harpsichordist, was assistant master of music at the Abbey as well as being master of music and choirmaster at the school from 1976 to 2001. Simon Lindley also held these posts a few years earlier; John Rutter's 1974 carol Jesus Child bears a dedication "for Simon Lindley and the choir of St Albans School".

Academic tradition

Scientific tradition

The school also has a long scientific tradition, stretching back to the Norman era, when Alexander Neckam became master of the school. Since the advent of modern science, the school has produced many famous scientists and mathematicians including cognitive scientist Colin Cherry, physicist Ian Grant, cosmologist Stephen Hawking (inspired by Dikran Tahta, a teacher at the school who later worked at the Open University), and mathematician Christopher Budd.  In the light of its long scientific heritage, the school was awarded a large sum of money in 2007 by the Wolfson Foundation to rebuild its physics laboratories to university standards. It has maintained a reputation for being a science and maths oriented school.

Historical tradition
St Albans School has also produced some notable historians and historiographers. In medieval times, the school and one of its alumni, Matthew Paris, were closely associated with the St Albans school of medieval historiography, and developed one of the first consistent methods of historical writing.  More recently; two teachers in the award-winning Ancient History department published a book on Roman sources in 2010. Some notable historians who are alumni of the school include Colin Renfrew, an archaeological historian and former Disney Professor of Archaeology at the University of Cambridge, Ernest Gellner, an anthropological historian, Professor Malcolm Schofield of St John's College, Cambridge, and more recently Justin Pollard, a TV historian, and Peter Sarris, a specialist on the Byzantine Empire and a fellow of Trinity College, Cambridge.

The school today
St Albans School is predominantly a single-sex school for boys, but has accepted girls into the sixth form since 1991. It is a member of the Headmasters' Conference of leading public schools. In its earlier days it was known as the Free School of St Albans, City of St Alban Grammar School or St Albans Grammar School. It is often (erroneously) referred to as "The Boys' School", "St Albans Boys" and "The Abbey School" (thereby causing confusion with The Abbey C of E Primary School nearby which is almost always referred to as "The Abbey School", and the adjacent but now defunct Abbey National Boys' School, a name which is still borne by a building in nearby Spicer Street).

The school operates a house system. The current system, which came into use in September 1996, assigns all members of the school to one of four houses. These are named after notable former pupils and staff: Hawking, Renfrew, Hampson and Marsh. Previously the house names were Abbey, Breakespeare, Debenham, Pemberton, Shirley, Woollams and School House.

In 1967 the School acquired what was then a derelict hill farm in the Brecon Beacons. The property, Pen Arthur, was fully restored and is now a well-equipped Field Studies Centre. Academic departments use Pen Arthur for field trips and study weekends throughout the year, and it plays a key part as a base for outdoor activities organised by the CCF and Duke of Edinburgh's Award Scheme. During their first year at the school, all pupils go to Pen Arthur for a week, during which time they participate in many "outward-bound" activities such as caving, hiking and even visiting a Roman gold mine.

Old Albanians

Former pupils of the school can use the title OA or "Old Albanian" after their name and are members of the Old Albanian Club. The Old Albanian Club has its own sports facilities at Woollam's, clubs, societies and also its own social networking website at www.oaconnect.co.uk.

12th century 
 Cardinal Boso (d. c. 1181), third English Cardinal
 Nicholas Breakspear (c. 1100–1159), who became Pope Adrian IV (1154–1159), the only English Pope.
 Alexander Neckam (1157–1217), scientist and teacher

13th century
Matthew Paris, monk and historian

14th century
 John Ball, Christian radical political thinker and leader of the Peasants' Revolt of 1381
 William Grindcobbe, a leader in St Albans of the Peasants' Revolt of 1381
 Richard of Wallingford (1292–1336) English mathematician who made major contributions to astronomy/astrology and horology
 Richard of Wallingford (late 14th century) a leader in St Albans of the Peasants' Revolt of 1381

15th century
 John Whethamstede (or Bostock) (c. 1392–1465), scholar, writer and Abbot of St Albans Abbey

16th century
 Walter Curle (1575–1647), Bishop of Winchester
 Robert Wright (1560–1643), first Warden of Wadham College, Oxford and Bishop of Lichfield & Coventry

17th century
 Henry Blount (1602–1682), traveller and writer
 William Cowper, 1st Earl Cowper (c. 1665–1723), Lord Chancellor of Great Britain, grandfather of William Cowper, poet and hymnodist
 William Dobson (1611–1646), painter to Charles I
 Major-General John Hill (?c. 1680–1735), M.P., army officer, politician and courtier
 Francis Pemberton (1624–1697), Lord Chief Justice

18th century
 William Domville, Bt (1742–1833), Lord Mayor of London 1813
 Thomas Walsh (1776–1849), Roman Catholic Bishop and Vicar Apostolic, Midlands and London Districts

19th century
 Colonel Sir Hildred Carlile, 1st Bt, M.P. (1852–1942), army officer, politician and philanthropist
 Alfred Faulkner (1882–1963), civil servant – Permanent Under-Secretary for Mines
 Henry Montague Grover (1791–1866), writer and theologian
 Coulson Kernahan (1858–1943), essayist, novelist and editor
 Frank Toovey Lake (1849–1868) Naval Officer who was part of Richard Henry Brunton's team who surveyed lighthouse sites around Japan
 Max Pemberton (1863–1950), novelist and editor
 Aubrey George Spencer (1795–1872), first Anglican Bishop of Newfoundland
 Thomas Spencer Wells (1818–1897), surgeon
 William Whitaker, (1836–1925), geologist
 Charles Williams (1886–1945), poet, novelist, publisher and theological writer

20th century
 Rod Argent (b. 1945), musician, founder member of The Zombies
 Keith M. Ashman (b. 1963), theoretical physicist and globular clusters expert
 Paul Atkinson (1946–2004), musician, founder member of The Zombies
 Ian Bell (b. 1962), co-author of Elite
 Tolaji Bola (b. 1999), association footballer
 Christopher Budd (b. 1960), mathematician
 Johnson Cann (b. 1937), geologist
 Colin Cherry (1914–1975), cognitive scientist
 Ralph Chubb (1892–1960), poet, printer and artist
 Sally Connolly (b. 1976), literary critic, author, and academic 
 Charles "Nick" Corfield (b. 1959), mathematician, computer programmer, and founder of several startup companies in Silicon Valley
 Rogers Covey-Crump (b. 1944), singer (tenor), member of The Hilliard Ensemble
 Charles Crawford (b. 1954) British diplomat and speechwriter
 Graham Dow (b. 1942), Bishop of Carlisle
 Bruce Duncan (b. 1938), Anglican priest
 Chris Duffield (b. 1952), Town Clerk and Chief Executive of the Corporation of the City of London since 2003
 Larry Elliott, Economics Editor of the Guardian
 Ernest Gellner (1925–1995), philosopher and social anthropologist 
 Dave Gibbons (b. 1949), Kirby Award winning comic book artist and co-creator of Watchmen
 Jack Goody, (1919–2015), social anthropologist
 Andrew Grant (b. 1968), novelist
 Ian Grant (b. 1930), mathematical physicist
 John Grimaldi (b. 1955), musician, songwriter, member of Argent
 David Grossman, political correspondent for Newsnight
 Hugh Grundy (b. 1945), musician, founder member of The Zombies
 Patrick Burnet Harris (b. 1934), former Bishop of Southwell
 Tim Hart (1948–2009), musician, founder member of electric folk band Steeleye Span
 Stephen Hawking (1942-2018), cosmologist and theoretical physicist
 Tony Hendra (b. 1941), satirist and writer
 General Sir Richard Lawson (b. 1927), Commander-in-Chief of Allied Forces Northern Europe 1982–96
 Yann Lovelock (b.1939), writer and interfaith worker
 Ed Macfarlane, member of the St Albans-based Indie band Friendly Fires
 Gregory Paul Martin (b. 1957), actor and writer
 Christopher Morris (b. 1938), TV news presenter, journalist and author
 Herbert Mundin (1898–1939), Hollywood character actor
 Mike Newell (b. 1942), film director
 Ray Pahl (1935–2011), sociologist
 Tony Penikett (b. 1945), writer and Canadian politician
 Charles Pereira (1913–2004), tropical agriculturist and hydrologist
 Justin Pollard (b. 1968), writer and historian
 Colin Renfrew (b. 1937), archaeologist
 Tim Rice (b. 1944), lyricist
 Charlie Scott (b. 1999), cricketer
 Joss Sheldon (b. 1982), author
 Harry Solomon (b. 1937), businessman
 Arthur Swinson (c. 1915–70), army officer, writer, playwright and historian
 Nicholas Tarling (1931–2017), historian
 Bob Wilkinson (1951–2021), rugby union player
 Richard Yeoman-Clark (1944-2019), BBC Radiophonics Engineer
 Kane Vincent-Young (b. 1996), association footballer
Azeem Alam (b. 1993), BEM, academic doctor and entrepreneur

Notable teachers

 Hilary Davan Wetton, musician
 David Franklin, broadcaster
 Geoffrey de Gorham (d. 1146), scholar, Abbot of St Albans Abbey 1119–1146
 Tommy Hampson (1907–1965), runner - 800m Olympic Champion (1932 in Los Angeles) and World Record holder (1:49.7)
 John Harmar was headmaster from 1626 to 1635
 Peter Hurford (1930-2019), organist
 Simon Lindley (b. 1948), organist 
 John Mole (b. 1941), poet, critic and jazz clarinettist. City of London Poet in Residence since 1998 (under the Poetry Society's Poet in the City scheme)
 Alexander Neckam (1157–1217), scientist and teacher
 Herbert Edward Palmer (1880–1961), poet
 Andrew Parnell (b. 1954), organist (master of music, 1976–2001)
 James Shirley (1596–1666), playwright
 Dikran Tahta (taught at the school 1955–1961), mathematician who taught Stephen Hawking
 Alistair Jolly (b. 1948), critic

In popular culture
 Some scenes, including the opening croquet game, of the BBC comedy All Gas and Gaiters were filmed at the school.
 The school was used as a site of part of the film Incendiary (2008).
 The school was mentioned in the 2004 film Alfie.
 The school featured in episode of Anneka Rice's show Treasure Hunt
 The school and areas around it substitute for Oxford colleges in Morse
 The school and Cathedral feature in BBC children's programme Grange Hill (Series 6, Episode 6 1983)

See also
List of the oldest schools in the world

References

External links
 Official school website 
 Independent Schools Inspectorate – St Albans School

Private schools in Hertfordshire
Schools in St Albans
948 establishments
Educational institutions established in the 10th century
Member schools of the Headmasters' and Headmistresses' Conference
10th-century establishments in England
Boarding schools